Richard "Richie" Panch (born May 28, 1954, in Daytona Beach, Florida – died September 1, 1985, near Rion, South Carolina) was a NASCAR Winston Cup Series driver from 1973 to 1976. He was the son of NASCAR Cup Series veteran Marvin Panch.

Career
His average start was 18th place while his average finish was 23rd place. His total earnings were $90,842 USD ($ when adjusted for inflation).

Death

Panch was killed on September 1, 1985, along with the other three people aboard a Piper PA-28 Cherokee that flew into a squall line and heavy rain near Rion, South Carolina, and came apart in mid-air.

References

1954 births
1985 deaths
Accidental deaths in South Carolina
NASCAR drivers
Racing drivers from Florida
Sportspeople from Daytona Beach, Florida
Victims of aviation accidents or incidents in 1985
Victims of aviation accidents or incidents in the United States